Saul Humberto Cordero born in Aguadilla, Puerto Rico is a well known radio and television personality in Aguadilla and Puerto Rico's west region.

Biography 

Saul has been in radio and TV for the past 50 years and has interviewed many important figures in the world of sports, politics, and culture.  He currently works as the anchorman of the West Coast daily news program for WOLE-TV. He also has a weekly program on WWNA (1340 AM) where he discusses topics of interest for the west coast residents.

Saul was born on November 16, 1940, in Aguadilla, Puerto Rico to Jose Cordero and Elena Ferrer. He has been married to Myrna Cerezo since 1966 and has one daughter and three sons.

References 

1940 births
Living people
People from Aguadilla, Puerto Rico
Puerto Rican radio personalities